Paralithosia is a genus of moths in the family Erebidae.

Species
 Paralithosia honei Daniel, 1954
 Paralithosia shaowuica Daniel, 1954

References

Natural History Museum Lepidoptera generic names catalog

Lithosiini
Moth genera